Marionia blainvillea is a species of sea slug, a dendronotid nudibranch, a marine gastropod mollusc in the family Tritoniidae.

Distribution
This species was described from the Mediterranean Sea. It is reported from the Atlantic Ocean as far north as the Bay of Biscay.

Juveniles of the species are white, as shown below.

References

Tritoniidae
Gastropods described in 1818